The Great Wall 0520CH was the first personal computer developed in China. It was created in 1985 by the State Computer Industrial Administration with Greatwall.

References

Personal computers